Many inhabited places in Xanthi Prefecture of Greece had older Greek and non-Greek forms. Most of those names were in use during the multinational environment of the Ottoman Empire, which controlled the region until the Balkan Wars on 1912–1913. Some of the forms were identifiably of Greek origin, others of Turkish, of Slavic and of more obscure origins. Following the First World War and the Greco-Turkish War which followed, an exchange of population took place between Greece, Yugoslavia, Bulgaria and Turkey (the Treaty of Neuilly between Greece and Bulgaria and the Treaty of Lausanne between Greece and Turkey). The villages of the exchanged populations (Bulgarians and Muslims) in Greece were resettled with Greek refugees from Asia Minor and local Macedonian Greeks.

The Greek government renamed many places with revived ancient names, local Greek-language names, or translations of the non-Greek names.:

References

External links
  List compiled by the Institute for Neohellenic Research

Xanthi (regional unit)
Xanthi
Place names of Turkish origin in Greece